Madge Augustine Oberholtzer (November 10, 1896 – April 14, 1925) was a white American woman whose rape and murder played a critical role in the demise of the second incarnation of the Ku Klux Klan. In March 1925, while working for the state of Indiana on an adult literacy campaign, Oberholtzer was abducted by D. C. Stephenson, Grand Dragon of the Indiana Klan. Holding her captive in his private train car, Stephenson raped and tortured her. Oberholtzer died from a combination of a staphylococcal infection from her injuries and kidney failure from mercury chloride poisoning, which she took while held captive in an attempt to commit suicide.

Following the suicide attempt, Stephenson's men returned Oberholtzer to her home, assuming her injuries would soon prove fatal and believing their influential leader was immune to any prosecution. However, Oberholtzer regained consciousness long enough to give a signed statement to police. She described Stephenson's assaults which led to his conviction at trial and led to the rapid decline of KKK membership in Indiana.

Early life
Born to German-American parents, Madge Oberholtzer grew up in Indianapolis, where her father worked as a postal clerk and her family belonged to the Irvington Methodist Church. Oberholtzer studied English, mathematics, zoology and logic at Butler College in Irvington, but she dropped out at the end of her junior year without saying why. Through her life, she lived with her parents in Irvington. By the time she met Stephenson, Oberholtzer was the manager of the Indiana Young People's Reading Circle, a special section of the Indiana Department of Public Instruction. However, she heard rumors that her job and the Reading Circle program were about to be eliminated due to budget cuts.

Chronology of the murder

Oberholtzer met Stephenson while attending Governor Edward L. Jackson's inauguration party at the Athletic Club in Indianapolis on January 12, 1925. In her dying statement, Oberholtzer claimed he asked her for a date several times after the banquet, but she refused; she eventually agreed, though, and they had dinner together. Following that date, Stephenson called Oberholtzer on the phone several times. She finally agreed to meet him for dinner at the Washington Hotel.

The two began seeing each other more frequently, and Oberholtzer acted as Stephenson's aide during the 1925 session of the Indiana General Assembly, carrying messages from his office to his friends. She also helped him write a nutrition book, One Hundred Years of Health. Using her Reading Circle connections, Oberholtzer intended to help Stephenson sell the book to school libraries throughout the state. She ended their relationship after attending a party at his mansion. They did not meet again until Sunday, March 15.

About 10:00 pm on March 15, Oberholtzer returned home after an evening with a friend. Her mother told her that Stephenson's secretary had called and said he was leaving for Chicago, leaving a message to call him before he left. Oberholtzer called Stephenson, who told her he would try to protect the Reading Circle program and her job if she agreed to see him. She changed into a black velvet dress, and a bodyguard she identified as "Mr. Gentry" arrived and escorted her to Stephenson's mansion a few blocks away. When she arrived, Stephenson, Gentry, and another bodyguard Oberholtzer identified as "Clenck" took her into the kitchen and forced her to drink whiskey until she became sick. The four men then took her upstairs, and Stephenson took a revolver from a dresser drawer and forced her to approach him at gunpoint.

Oberholtzer said the men took her to the garage and forced her into Stephenson's car. Before they left, Stephenson told Clenck to stay behind and tell his associate, Claude Worley, that he was going to Chicago for a business meeting. When they reached the railroad station, Stephenson and Gentry forced Oberholtzer onto Stephenson's private train to Chicago. No sooner had they entered the train's compartment coach than Stephenson grabbed the bottom of her dress and pulled it over her head. He then grabbed her hands, tore off the rest of her clothes, pushed her into the lower bed, and raped her repeatedly. He also bit her all over her body; an examination later revealed deep bite wounds on her face, neck, breasts, back, legs, ankles, and tongue. Oberholtzer, still intoxicated and unable to resist, eventually passed out.

Upon waking, Oberholtzer confronted Stephenson and said, "The law will get their hands on you!" Because Stephenson's connections to the Indiana Klan gave him tremendous political power, he laughed and replied, "I am the law in Indiana." Gentry and Stephenson dressed Oberholtzer and told her they would be stopping in Hammond, where the three checked into the Indiana Hotel. Stephenson forced Oberholtzer to say that she was his wife so they could share the same room. He forced her to write a telegram to her mother, saying she had decided to go to Chicago with him. While Stephenson was sleeping, Oberholtzer grabbed his revolver to kill herself but changed her mind, fearing it would dishonor her mother. Instead, she decided to commit suicide by taking poison. The next morning, Oberholtzer convinced Stephenson to contact another chauffeur, whom Stephenson nicknamed "Shorty", and tell him to come to the hotel so she could purchase a black silk hat.

Upon purchasing the hat, Oberholtzer asked Shorty to drive her to a druggist to buy some rouge. She bought an entire box of mercuric chloride tablets. Oberholtzer returned to her room but, still weakened from the wounds Stephenson had inflicted on her, only managed to swallow three tablets. She vomited blood throughout the remainder of the day. Stephenson insisted that he would not take her to a hospital unless she agreed to go to a nearby chapel and marry him; however, he panicked and ordered Shorty to drive them back to Indianapolis. When he was asked what had happened, a bodyguard said she had been in a car accident.

Oberholtzer's parents immediately called a doctor, but nothing could be done to save her. On March 28, Oberholtzer explained what had happened to her in a signed statement. She died on April 14, 1925, from a staph infection from the bites, plus kidney failure from the mercury poisoning. She was buried at Memorial Park Cemetery in Indianapolis.

Trial
Stephenson was indicted on charges of rape and second-degree murder. The doctor who had examined Oberholtzer testified that the injuries she received were sufficient to have killed her, as her wounds developed an infection that reached her lungs and kidneys.

Stephenson's attorney claimed Oberholtzer had committed suicide, saying the rapist could not have anticipated her behavior. The prosecution countered to the effect that, based on medical testimony, prompt medical attention might have saved her life. During closing statements, the prosecutor decried Stephenson as a "destroyer of virtue and womanhood". The jury found him guilty of second-degree murder, rape, and kidnapping, and the court sentenced him to life in prison. The Indiana Supreme Court rejected his appeal. This case is still taught in law schools as showing an enlargement of the causal relationships that define homicide.

Aftermath
The brutal attack on Oberholtzer so outraged most members of the Indiana Klan that entire lodges quit en masse, and membership dropped by the tens of thousands. The scandal destroyed the Klan in Indiana, and in the following two years, the KKK lost more than 178,000 members, nearly disappearing.

Denied a pardon in 1926, Stephenson started talking to the Indianapolis Times, giving the names of officials who had accepted bribes and payments from the Klan, prompting an investigation by the newspaper. The state of Indiana finally indicted several high-ranking officials, including Governor Edward L. Jackson and the head of the Republican Party in Marion County. Other local officials resigned when facing charges. The Times investigation revealed widespread political corruption, which helped destroy the Klan in Indiana and nationwide. By February 1928, Indiana Klan rosters had dropped to just 4,000, from a peak of more than 250,000 members in 1925.

Stephenson was paroled on March 23, 1950, but he violated the conditions of his parole by disappearing around September 25 of that year. He was captured in Minneapolis on December 15, and was ordered by the court in 1951 to serve another ten years. He was paroled on December 22, 1956, on the condition that he leave Indiana and never return.

In 1961, Stephenson was arrested in Tennessee at age 70 on charges of sexually assaulting a 16-year-old girl, but the charges were dropped on grounds of insufficient evidence. He died five years later.

Representation in other media
Actress Mel Harris portrayed Oberholtzer in the TV miniseries Cross of Fire (1989).

See also
List of kidnappings
List of solved missing person cases

References

Further reading 
 Ottinger, Charlotte Halsema; "Madge, The Life and Times of Madge Oberholtzer: the Young Irvington Woman Who Took Down D. C. Stephenson and the Ku Klux Klan," Irvington Historical Society, 2021.
 Lutholtz, M. William; Grand Dragon: D.C. Stephenson and the Ku Klux Klan in Indiana.
 Newton, Michael, and Judy Ann Newton; The Ku Klux Klan: An Encyclopedia, New York & London: Garland Publishing, 1991.
 
 "Ku Klux Klan Resources", Indiana State Library
 "STEPHENSON v. STATE - Supreme Court of Indiana", State University of New York at Buffalo

External links

1896 births
1920s missing person cases
1925 deaths
1925 suicides
20th-century American educators
20th-century American women educators
American murder victims
American people of German descent
Deaths from staphylococcal infection
Deaths from kidney failure
Deaths from heavy metal poisoning
Female murder victims
Formerly missing people
History of women in Indiana
Kidnapped American people
Missing person cases in Indiana
People from Indianapolis
People murdered in Indiana
Schoolteachers from Indiana
Suicides by poison
1925 murders in the United States
1925 in Indiana
Ku Klux Klan in Indiana
Victims of the Ku Klux Klan